The Lord protects the simple is a phrase from a verse in the Hebrew Bible. In Judaism, the phrase has both a plain meaning and another meaning due to rabbinic exegesis.

From Psalms
 states: "The Lord protects the simple, I was brought low and he saved me."  According to the plain meaning of this verse, the Psalmist is expressing confidence and gratitude to the divine.

This verse (and Psalm) are recited by Jews in the liturgical thanksgiving prayer, the Hallel.

Rabbinic tradition
In the rabbinic tradition, this verse takes on an entirely different and quite important meaning. The verse represents a principle of Jewish law (halakha) that permits people to assume various low-level risks and dangers. Risk may be taken because, as the verse states, the deity protects people who are "simple". In Jewish ethics and law, the principle of "The Lord protects the simple" has been applied at times to permit cigarette smoking, circumcision at inauspicious moments, bloodletting, unprotected intercourse for women perceived to be at risk, and such instances as the marriage of a woman whose previous two husbands had died ("isha katlanit").

References

Babylonian Talmud. Shabbat 129b, Yevamot 12b and 82a
 Torat Chesed Shneur Zalman of Lyady, (Lublin) EH 44
 Igrot Moshe, Moshe Feinstein. EH 1:63 and 4:73
 Freedman, Benjamin. Duty and healing: Foundations of a Jewish bioethic Routledge, 1999. (See section 4.)

Jewish ethical law
Hebrew Bible words and phrases